Maurice White is the debut album by American singer and musician Maurice White released in September 1985 on Columbia Records. The album rose to number 12 upon the Billboard Top R&B Albums chart and No. 35 on the Dutch Album Top 100.

Overview
The self titled album was produced by Maurice White. Artists such as Gerald Albright, Jeff Lorber, Ricky Lawson of Yellowjackets, Paul Jackson Jr., Martin Page, Wayne Vaughn and Wanda Vaughn of The Emotions appeared on the record. The album was also reissued in 2001 with four bonus tracks entitled "Life" (Freedom mix), "Life", "Adventures of the Heart" and "Sam the Jam".

Singles
A cover of Ben E. King's  
"Stand by Me" got to No. 6 on the Billboard Hot Soul Songs chart, No. 11 on the Billboard Adult Contemporary Songs chart and No. 5 on the RPM Canadian Adult Contemporary Songs chart.

Another single called "I Need You" rose to No. 20 upon the Billboard Adult Contemporary Songs chart and No. 30 on the Billboard Hot Soul Songs chart.

Critical reception

Robin Denselow of The Guardian called the album a "lush collection of self produced dance tracks, and the occasional ballad, with synths and drum programming immaculately in place, and the vocals as classy as ever". Andrew Hamilton of Allmusic wrote "Maurice White gives an excellent account on his solo debut". Simon Warner of Popmatters described the LP as a "treasure" which "distils the fervent energy of his group but offers an appealing showcase for White's confident vocal manner." J.D. Considine of Musician said the "Given his status as Earth, Wind & Fire's Shining Star, it comes as no surprise that White's first solo project sounds a lot like classic EW&F: tight, focused and punchy. But while White remembers to sink a hook into every verse and chorus, the emphasis here is on subtlety and sophistication as he works his way from R&B basics..with a sense of craft that makes slickness irrelevant".

Track listing

Original release

2001 reissue

Personnel

Musicians 
 Gerald Albright - saxophone 
 Gerald Brown - drums 
 Bill Bottrell - finger snapping 
 Vinnie Colaiuta - drums
 Michel Colombier - keyboards 
 Paulinho da Costa - percussion 
 Bill Reichenbach Jr. - trombone
 Sheldon Reynolds - guitar 
 Greg Phillinganes - synthesizer, soloist 
 Michael Boddicker - synthesizer programming 
 Robbie Buchanan - synthesizer, arrangements, keyboards, drum programming, assistant producer 
 Brian Fairweather - background vocals, chants, associate producer, vocal arrangement, drum programming, vocoder, rhythm arrangements 
 Dean Gant - synthesizer, arrangements, drum programming 
 Rupert Greenall - synthesizer 
 Donald Griffin - guitar 
 Jerry Hey - trumpet
 Marva Holcolm - background vocals 
 Paul Jackson, Jr. - guitar, rhythm arrangements
 Abraham Laboriel - bass guitar
 Michael Landau - guitar
 Ricky Lawson - drums
 Paul Leim - Simmons drum programming
 Jeff Lorber - synthesizer 
 Marlon McClain - guitar 
 Martin Page - bass guitar, arrangements, background vocals, chants, associate producer, vocal arrangement, rhythm arrangements
 John "J.R." Robinson - drums
 Julia Tillman - background vocals 
 Wanda Vaughn - background vocals 
 Wayne Vaughn - synthesizer, arrangements 
 Maurice White - percussion, lead vocals, background vocals, kalimba, producer, chants, mixing, original recording producer, vocoder
 David Williams - guitar
 Peter Wolf - keyboards, synthesizer, drum programming, chants

Miscellaneous Credits 
 Mixing: Paul Klingberg
Mixing:  Bill Bottrell
Mixing:  Eric ET Thorngren
 Art Direction: Donald Lane, Howard Fritzson
 Photography: Harry Langdon
 Make-Up: Tara Posey
 Liner Notes: Ramsey Lewis
 Tape Research: Matthew Kelly	 
 Packaging Manager: Mike Cimicata
 Assistant: Cameron Marcarelli
 Reissue: Leo Sacks- Liner Notes, Reissue Producer, Mixing

Charts

References 

1985 debut albums
Albums produced by Maurice White
Columbia Records albums